Tissues and Issues is the fifth studio album by the Welsh singer Charlotte Church released by Sony BMG UK in the United Kingdom on 11 July 2005. The album debuted on the UK Albums Chart at number five and was accredited platinum by BPI for sales over 300,000. The album yielded Church four successful top twenty singles; "Crazy Chick", "Call My Name", "Even God" and "Moodswings (To Come at Me like That)".

The album represents a whole new direction for the singer. Her previous album, Prelude, a 'best of' album, had ended her classical career; Tissues and Issues is her first ever pop album.

The first single to be taken from the album, "Crazy Chick", released shortly before the album itself, reached number two on the UK Singles Chart. "Call My Name", the second single, reached number ten in October 2005. "Even God", the third single, debuted in the Top 20 in early December 2005. The fourth single, "Moodswings (To Come at Me like That)", was released on 27 February 2006, and peaked at number fourteen on the UK charts.

Tissues and Issues is Charlotte Church's second and final album with Sony Music UK.

Track listing

Notes
When "Even God" was released as a single on 12 December 2005, the name was changed to "Even God Can't Change the Past".

Charts

Release history

References

2005 albums
Charlotte Church albums
Albums produced by Tore Johansson
Dance-pop albums by Welsh artists
Teen pop albums